The House of Hasan-Jalalyan ( was an Armenian dynasty that ruled the region of Khachen (Greater Artsakh) from 1214 onwards in what are now the regions of lower Karabakh, Nagorno-Karabakh and small part of Syunik. It was named after Hasan-Jalal Dawla (Հասան-Ջալալ Դոլա), an Armenian feudal prince from Khachen. The Hasan-Jalalyan family was able to maintain its autonomy throughout several centuries of foreign domination of the region by Seljuk Turks, Persians and Mongols. They, as well as the other Armenian princes and meliks of Khachen, saw themselves as holding the last bastion of Armenian independence in the region.

Through their patronage of many churches and other monuments, the Hasan-Jalalyans helped cultivate Armenian culture throughout the region. By the late 16th century, the Hasan-Jalalyan family had branched out to establish melikdoms in Gulistan and Jraberd, besides their original holdings in the melikdom of Khachen. Along with the separately ruled melikdoms of Varanda and Dizak, these five principalities formed the Five Melikdoms of Karabakh, also known as the Melikdoms of Khamsa.

Origins
Hasan-Jalal traced his descent to the Armenian Aranshahik dynasty, a family that predated the establishment of the Parthian Arsacids in the region. Hasan-Jalal's ancestry was "almost exclusively" Armenian according to historian Robert H. Hewsen, a professor at Rowan University and an expert on the history of the Caucasus:

Much of Hasan-Jalal Dawla's family roots were entrenched in an intricate array of royal marriages with new and old Armenian nakharar families. Hasan-Jalal's grandfather was Hasan I (also known as Hasan the Great), a prince who ruled over the northern half of Artsakh.

In 1182, he stepped down as ruler of the region and entered monastic life at Dadivank, dividing his land into two: the southern half (comprising much of Khachen) went to his oldest son Vakhtank II (also known as Tangik) and the northern half went to the youngest, Gregory "the Black." Vakhtank II married Khorishah Zakarian, who was the daughter of Sargis Zakarian, the progenitor of the Zakarid line of princes. When he married the daughter of the Aṛanshahik king of Dizak-Balk, Mamkan, Hasan-Jalal also inherited his father-in-law's lands.

In the late 1960s and into the 1970s, Hasan-Jalal's origins became a part of a larger debate revolving around the history of Artsakh between Armenian and Azerbaijani scholars. In addition to the position held almost solely by Azerbaijani historians that much of Artsakh at the time was under heavy Caucasian Albanian influence, they also contend that the population and monuments were not Armenian but Caucasian Albanian in origin (this argument has also been employed against Armenian monuments in the region of Nakhichevan). Among the foremost revisionists who expounded these views were Ziya Bunyadov and Farida Mamedova. Mamedova herself asserted that Hasan-Jalal, based upon her interpretation of an inscription carved into the Gandzasar Monastery by the prince, was Caucasian Albanian. Armenian historians, as well as experts of the region such as Hewsen, reject her conclusions, along with the notion held in Azerbaijan that the Armenians "stole" Caucasian Albania's culture.

Reign under Hasan-Jalal Dawla

Culture
With the surrender of Ani to the Byzantine Empire in 1045 and the Byzantine annexation of Kars in 1064, the final independent Armenian state in historic Armenia, the Bagratuni kingdom, came to an end. However, despite foreign domination of the region, which became more pronounced after the Seljuk Turks defeated the Byzantines at the Battle of Manzikert in 1071, Armenians in eastern Armenia were able to maintain autonomy in the two mountainous kingdoms of Syunik and Lori and in the Principality of Khachen. From the early to mid-12th century, combined Georgian and Armenian armies were successful in pushing the Turks out of Eastern Armenia, thereby establishing a period of relative peace and prosperity until the appearance of the Mongols in 1236.

Khachen used to be a part of Syunik until numerous Turkic invasions severed it from the rest of the kingdom. The reign of the Hasan-Jalalyan family was concentrated around the Terter and the Khachenaget rivers. Hasan-Jalal's birth date is unknown․ His reign began in 1214 and ended with his death sometime between 1261–1262 in Qazvin. His domain encompassed both Artsakh and the surrounding Armenian regions. When his father Vakhtank died in 1214, Hasan-Jalal inherited his lands and took up residence in a castle at Akana in Jraberd. He was addressed with the titles tagavor (king) or inknakal (autocrat or absolute ruler; ինքնակալ) but took the official title of "King of Artsakh and Balk" when he married the daughter of the final king of Dizak-Balk. The medieval Armenian historian Kirakos Gandzaketsi extolled Hasan-Jalal in his work History of Armenia, showering him with praise for his piety and devotion to Christianity:

A further testament to this devotion included Hasan-Jalal's commissioning of the Gandzasar Monastery. Construction of the monastery began in 1216 and lasted until 1238. On July 22, 1240, amid great celebration during Vardavar celebrations and in the presence of nearly 700 priests including Nerses, the Catholicos of Albania, the church was consecrated. The monastery went on to become the residence and sepulcher of the family as well as the house of the catholicos; beginning in the 15th century, the family also monopolized control over the seat of Catholicos itself, which would thereon pass down from uncle to nephew. Hasan-Jalal's son John VII is considered to be the first to have established this practice when he became the Catholicos whereas his nephew, also named John, became the second.

Despite his faithfulness to Christianity, Muslim influence in the region had pervaded and influenced the culture and customs of the Christians living in Georgia and Armenia, especially after the Seljuk Turks invaded the Caucasus. Byzantine art scholar Anthony Eastmond, for example, notes that "many of the outward manifestations of [Hasan-Jalal's] rule were presented through Islamic customs and titles, most notably in his depiction on his principal foundation of Gandzasar." The image of Hasan-Jalal on the drum of Gandzasar's dome has him sitting cross-legged, which Eastmond remarks was a "predominant device for depicting power at the Seljuq court." Muslim influence was also seen in Hasan-Jalal's name: as a fashion of the time, many Armenians adopted Arabic patronymics (kunya) that lost any "connexion with original Armenian names." Hasan-Jalal's Armenian name was Haykaz but the Arabic words in his name, in fact, described his person; thus, Hasan meant handsome; Jalal, grand; Dawla, wealth and governance.

Hasan-Jalal's Armenian Synaxarion
Gandzasar became home to Armenia's first completed Haysmavurk (Synaxarion), a calendar collection of short lives of saints and accounts of important religious events. The idea to have a new, better organized Haysmavurk came from Hasan-Jalal himself, who then placed his request with Father Israel (Ter-Israel), a disciple of an important Armenian medieval philosopher and Artsakh native known as Vanakan Vardapet. The Haysmavurk was further developed by Kirakos Gandzaketsi. Ever since the Haysmavurk ordered by Hasan-Jalal became known as "Synaxarion of Ter-Israel;" it was mass printed in Constantinople in 1834.

Mongol invasion

In 1236, the Ilkhanate Mongol armies invaded the Caucasus. Prior to them entering Khachen, Hasan Jalal and his people were able to take refuge at Ishkhanberd (located directly south of Gandzasar; also known by its Persian name of Khokhanaberd). Given its formidable location atop a mountain, the Mongols chose not to besiege the fortress and sued for negotiations with Hasan-Jalal: they exchanged his loyalty and military service to the Mongol Empire in return for some of the immediate lands adjacent to Khachen that they had conquered. Later, in 1240-1242 Hasan Jalal even had struck coins of common Mongol types in Khachen on the mints of "Qarabāgh" (in Khokhanaberd) and "Lajīn" (in Havkakhaghats berd).

Feeling the need to preserve his power, Hasan-Jalal traveled twice to Karakorum, the capital of the Mongol empire, where he was able to obtain special autonomy rights and privileges for himself and the people under his domain from the ruling khan. Despite this arrangement, the Mongols viewed many of the people of the region with contempt and taxed them excessively. Arghun Khan, the regional Mongol ostikan at the time, placed so many restrictions against Armenians that it prompted Hasan-Jalal in 1256 to journey to the capital once more to protest against the encroachments upon Catholicos Nerses. In response, Batu Khan drafted a document "guaranteeing freedom for Lord Nerses, Katolikos of Albania, for all his properties and goods, that he be free and untaxed and allowed to travel freely everywhere in the dioceses under his authority, and that no one disobey what he said."

Hasan-Jalal also attempted to strengthen his alliances with the Mongols by having his daughter Rhuzukan marry Bora Noyan, the son of a Mongol leader. Relations between Armenians and Mongols continued to deteriorate, however, and the document issued by the khan failed to uphold its promises.

Finally, in 1260, Hasan-Jalal decided to ally himself with the forces of the Georgian king David Narin, who was leading an insurrection against Mongol rule. He was captured several times by the Mongols yet his family was able to free him by paying a ransom. The insurrection eventually failed and under the orders of Arghun Khan, Hasan-Jalal was arrested once more and taken to Qazvin, (now in Iran). According to Kirakos Ganzaketsi, Rhuzukan appealed to the Hulagu Khan's wife Doquz Khatun, to pressure Arghun to free her father. However, as Arghun Khan learned of this, he had Hasan-Jalal tortured and finally executed. Hasan Jalal's son Atabek sent several of his men to Iran to retrieve his father's dismembered body, which had been tossed into a well. After it was brought back, the body was given a proper funeral and buried at Gandzasar monastery.

Later family rule
Following his death, the family truncated Hasan-Jalal's official title to the shorter "Princes of Artsakh." Atabek was ordered by Hulegu to take over his father's position and held the post until 1306. His cousin Vakhtank, whose descendants would become the Melik-Avanyan family, was given control over the region of Dizak. As a method of showing their relation to Hasan-Jalal, his descendants adopted Hasan-Jalal as their surname and appended the suffix -yan at the end. The family funded numerous architectural and cultural projects which continue to stand today, including Gandzasar monastery and the adjacent Church of St. John the Baptist. In the late 16th century, the family branched out and established melikdoms in settlements in Jraberd, Khachen and Gulistan.

Liberation movement
During the Turko-Persian wars of the 17th century and 18th century, the meliks fiercely resisted and fought back against incursions made by both sides. In the last quarter of the 18th century, they aided the invading Russian armies to help clear the region of both the Turks and Persians. The Hasan-Jalalyans were one of the most prominent of the melik families that took up the cause to liberate the region from foreign control; the foremost among them being Catholicos Yesayi Hasan-Jalalyan (? - 1728). In 1677, Armenian Catholicos Hakob of Julfa had held a secret meeting with the meliks of Karabakh, proposing that a delegation journey to Europe to garner support for the liberation of the region. In 1711, Yesayi, accompanying Israel Ori, traveled to Russia to gather support for the formation of an Armenian army under Peter the Great. Ori, however, died on the way, and Yesayi soon took over as the lead figure of the movement. He continued negotiations with Peter, and in a letter sent to him in 1718, promised the support of a 10–12,000-man Armenian army as well as support from neighboring Georgian forces. His entreaties continued until 1724, when the Treaty of Constantinople (1724) was signed by Peter the Great that gave the Muslim-populated regions in eastern Transcaucasia to Russia and Christian-populated western regions to the Turks. Both had just finished conquering swaths of Safavid territory comprising large parts of the Caucasus and Eastern Anatolia while the Safavid realm was disintegrating in a civil war. 
Russian interest in the Caucasus soon waned after Peter's death in 1725 as its leaders pulled their forces back across the Terek River. The territories gained by Russia in the North and South Caucasus were ceded back to Iran (now led by Nader Shah) per the treaties of Resht and Ganja of 1732 and 1735, respectively.

While the Ottomans temporarily gained the Christian regions of the disintegrating Safavid realm, Yesai was blamed for this failure by some of the leaders of the Armenian army as they were forced to fend for themselves against the Turkish invasions.

From the 17th century to the early 19th century, several cadet branches of the Hasan-Jalalyans were established, including the Melik-Atabekyan family, who became the last rulers of the principality of Jraberd. Allahverdi II Hasan-Jalalyan, who died in 1813, was the final melik of Khachen when the Russian Empire gained control of the region in 1805 during the Russo-Persian War of 1804–1813. In 1828, following the end of the second Russo-Persian War and the cession of Persia's last territories in the South Caucasus to Russia according to the Treaty of Turkmenchay, the Russians dissolved the Catholicosate of Albania, although a member of the Hasan-Jalalyan family, Balthasar, became Primate of Artsakh, which was tantamount of the position of Catholicos of Albania in all but name.

Hasan-Jalalyans today

At the time of the publication of Hewsen's initial article in the journal Revue des Études Arméniennes, the author was unable to trace any survivors of the house but did note that the final two Catholicos of Albania, Hovhannes XII (1763–1786) and Sargis II (1794–1815), had a dozen brothers altogether, all who left a "numerous progeny by the middle of the nineteenth century." He was also able to identify a woman named Eleanora Hasan-Jalalian who was living in Yerevan as an artist at the turn of the 19th to 20th century. In later years, Soviet sources also listed the biography of Ruben Hasan-Jalalyan (1840–1902), an Armenian writer, poet and lawyer who lived in the Russian Empire. One person, a man named Stepan Hasan Jalalyan from Drmbon, Martakert Region of Nagorno Karabakh, served as a deputy in the Armenian National Assembly as a member of the Heritage Party and fought in the First Nagorno-Karabakh War.

Several artifacts of the Hasan-Jalalyans survive until today, including Hasan-Jalal's personal dagger, complete with an Armenian inscription, which is currently on display at the Hermitage Museum in St Petersburg.

See also
Armenian nobility
Principality of Khachen
Nagorno Karabakh Republic
Artsakh
Nagorno Karabakh
Culture of Nagorno-Karabakh
History of Nagorno-Karabakh
List of Armenians from Nagorno-Karabakh

External links
 Gandzasar.com: Gandzasar Monastery, Nagorno Karabakh Republic
 The Hasan-Jalalyans, Charitable, Cultural Foundation of Country Development.

Further reading

Articles
Hewsen, Robert H. "The Kingdom of Arc'ax" in Medieval Armenian Culture (University of Pennsylvania Armenian Texts and Studies). Thomas J. Samuelian and Michael E. Stone (eds.) Chico, California: Scholars Press, 1984, pp. 42–68, 
"The Meliks of Eastern Armenia: A Preliminary Study." Revue des Études Arméniennes 9 (1972), pp. 255–329.
 "The Meliks of Eastern Armenia: II." Revue des Études Arméniennes 10 (1973–1974), pp. 281–303.
"The Meliks of Eastern Armenia: III." Revue des Études Arméniennes 11 (1975–1976), pp. 219–243.

Primary Sources

Esayi Hasan Jalaleants. A Brief History of the Aghuank Region, trans. by George Bournoutian. Costa Mesa, CA: Mazda Publishers, 2009.
Kirakos Gandzaketsi. History of Armenia . Trans. Robert Bedrosian.

Secondary and Tertiary Sources

 Orbeli, Joseph. Асан Жалал дoла, Kниаз Xaчeнcки [Hasan-Jalal Dawla, Lord of Khachen]. Izvestiia Imperatorskoi Akademii Nauk 3 (1909). Reprinted in Izbrannii Trudi. Yerevan, 1963.
 Raffi. The Melikdoms of Khamsa . Yerevan: Nairi, 1991.
 Toumanoff, Cyril. "Manuel de généalogie et de chronologie pour l'histoire de la Caucasie Chrétienne (Arménie-Géorgie-Albanie)." Edizioni Aquila, Roma, 1976.
 Ulubabian, Bagrat. Khacheni ishkhanutyune, X-XVI darerum [The Principality of Khachen during the tenth to sixteenth centuries]. Yerevan: Armenian Academy of Sciences, 1975.
 Ulubabian, Bagrat. "Hasan-Jalal Dawla" and "Hasan-Jalalyan Family" in Armenian Soviet Encyclopedia. vol. 6. Yerevan: Armenian Academy of Sciences, 1980.
 Ts. P. Aghaian et al., eds., "Hay zhoghovurde feodalizmi vayrejki zhamanakashrjanum, XVI-XVIII dd." [The Armenian People and the Period of Decline of Feudalism from the Fourteenth to Eighteenth Century] in Hay zhoghovrdi patmutyun. vol. 5. Yerevan: Armenian Academy of Sciences, 1976.

Notes

Bagratuni dynasty
Armenian noble families
Princes of Khachen